Qaarsorsuatsiaq Island (old spelling: Qaersorssuatsiaq) is an island in Avannaata municipality in northwestern Greenland.

Geography 
Qaarsorsuatsiaq Island is located in the outer belt of islands in Tasiusaq Bay, in the south-central part of Upernavik Archipelago. The inner waterways of Tasiusaq Bay separate it from Innaarsuit Island in the east. Several skerries buffer the western coast of the island. The highest point on the island is Cuthbert Peak in the west, reaching .

References

Tasiusaq Bay
Islands of the Upernavik Archipelago